The Dalitz plot is a two-dimensional plot often used in particle physics to represent the relative frequency of various (kinematically distinct) manners in which the products of certain (otherwise similar) three-body decays may move apart.

The phase-space of a decay of a pseudoscalar into three spin-0 particles can be completely described using two variables. In a traditional Dalitz plot, the axes of the plot are the squares of the invariant masses of two pairs of the decay products. (For example, if particle A decays to particles 1, 2, and 3, a Dalitz plot for this decay could plot m212 on the x-axis and m223 on the y-axis.) If there are no angular correlations between the decay products then the distribution of these variables is flat. However symmetries may impose certain restrictions on the distribution.  Furthermore, three-body decays are often dominated by resonant processes, in which the particle decays into two decay products, with one of those decay products immediately decaying into two additional decay products. In this case, the Dalitz plot will show a non-uniform distribution, with a peak around the mass of the resonant decay. In this way, the Dalitz plot provides an excellent tool for studying the dynamics of three-body decays.

Dalitz plots play a central role in the discovery of new particles in current high-energy physics experiments, including  Higgs boson research, and are tools in exploratory efforts that might open avenues beyond the Standard Model.   

R.H. Dalitz introduced this technique in 1953 to study decays of K mesons (which at that time were still referred to as "tau-mesons"). It can be adapted to the analysis of four-body decays as well.  A specific form of a four-particle Dalitz plot (for non-relativistic kinematics), which is based on a tetrahedral coordinate system, was first applied to study the few-body dynamics in atomic four-body fragmentation processes.

Square Dalitz plot 

Modeling of the common representation of the Dalitz plot can be complicated due to its nontrivial shape. One can however introduce such kinematic variables so that Dalitz plot gets a rectangular (or squared) shape:

;

;

where   is the invariant mass of particles 1 and 2 in a given decay event;  and   are its maximal and minimal kinematically allowed values, while   is the angle between particles 1 and 3 in the rest frame of particles 1 and 2. This technique is commonly called "Square Dalitz plot" (SDP).

References

External links 
 Dalitz Plots: Past and Present (a presentation by Brian Lindquist at SLAC) 

Plots (graphics)
Scattering
Experimental particle physics